Locklin is a surname. Notable people with the surname include:

Billy Ray Locklin (born 1936), American football defensive lineman
Gerald Locklin, American poet
Hank Locklin (1918–2009), American country music singer-songwriter
Kerry Locklin (born 1959), Canadian football defensive line coach
Loryn Locklin (born 1968), American actress
Stu Locklin (1928–2016), American Major League Baseball outfielder